A person who lives in or comes from Seattle, Washington, is called a Seattleite. This is a list of well known people who were born, lived, or grew up in the city of Seattle.

Born in Seattle

Living

Athletics

 Josh Barnett – MMA fighter, former Ultimate Fighting Championship heavyweight champion
 Peter Baum – lacrosse player
 Fred Couples – professional golfer
 Jamal Crawford – professional basketball player
 Gail Devers – track and field athlete, Olympic track-and-field gold medalist
 Joan Dunlap-Seivold – former soccer player
 Tom Gorman – tennis player
 Marcus Hahnemann – professional soccer goalkeeper
 B. J. Johnson – swimmer
 Kimber Lee – professional wrestler
 Dejounte Murray – professional basketball player for the Atlanta Hawks
 Apolo Ohno – world champion and Olympic gold-medalist short track speed skater
 John Olerud – professional baseball player who played at Washington State University
 Paul Renkert – retired professional soccer player
 Nate Robinson – NBA player, known for winning three All-Star Dunk contests
 Tim Sedlacek – retired soccer forward who played professionally in the Major Indoor Soccer League, American Soccer League, and American Indoor Soccer Association
 Chester Simmons – professional basketball player
 Maurice Smith – mixed martial artist
 Jason Terry – professional basketball player
 Greg Valentine – professional wrestler; inducted into the WWE Hall of Fame (2004)
 DeAndre Yedlin (born 1993) – professional soccer player for Newcastle United F.C. and the United States men's national soccer team
 Katelyn Ohashi – professional gymnast for UCLA, multi time awardee for the US  
 Jaden McDaniels – NBA player

Business

 Bill Gates – co-founder of Microsoft
 Edward Giddings - architect and painter

Literature

 Matt Briggs – writer
 Raegan Butcher – poet
 Mary Matsuda Gruenewald – memoirist
 David Guterson – author
 Brian Herbert – author
 Tan Lin – writer
 Leslie Rule – author, novelist, paranormal writer

Movies, television, and media

 Ken Jennings – Jeopardy! contestant and guest host, author, podcaster
 Jon Jon Augustavo – director
 John Aylward – actor (ER, Mad Men, House of Lies, Gangster Squad) 
 David Michael Barrett – screenwriter and film producer
 Craig Bartlett – Hey Arnold! creator
 Bob Bingham – Jesus Christ Superstar actor
 Josie Bissett – actress (Melrose Place); ex-wife of Rob Estes
 Tori Black – porn star
 Dove Cameron – actress, singer
 Erika Christensen – actress
 Bobby Clark – actor
 Brett Davern –  actor, podcaster Awkward (TV series)
 Graham Elliot – chef, restauranter 
 India Gants – model, winner of America’s Next Top Model Cycle 23
 Tom Gorai – film producer
 Brian Haley – actor, comedian
 Bianca Kajlich – television actress noted for role of Jennifer on Rules of Engagement
 Richard Karn – television actor, game show host
 Mike Luckovich – editorial cartoonist
 Dave Losso – stand-up comedian
 Beau Mirchoff – actor known for television series Awkward
 Brian Stokes Mitchell – Broadway actor and baritone singer
 Jeffrey Dean Morgan – actor, known for Grey's Anatomy, Watchmen, Magic City
 Mark Morris – director, choreographer, dancer
 Janice Pennington – The Price Is Right model
 Megyn Price – actress known for roles on Grounded for Life and Rules of Engagement
 Nick Robinson – actor known for portraying Ryder Scanlon on ABC Family sitcom Melissa & Joey
 Omari Salisbury – journalist, videographer, media company owner
 Derek Sheen – stand-up comedian
 Jean Smart – actress, known for Designing Women, Kim Possible, Frasier, 24
 Ryan Stiles – comedian, known for Whose Line Is It Anyway? (both U.S. and U.K. versions), and playing Lewis Kiniski on The Drew Carey Show, and Herb Melnick on Two and a Half Men
 Alison Sudol – actress, singer, songwriter
 Jen Taylor – video game voice actress
 Maiara Walsh – actress, Cory in the House, Desperate Housewives, Switched at Birth
 Zoe Weizenbaum – actress, 12 and Holding, Memoirs of a Geisha
 Rainn Wilson – actor, The Office

Music

 Nissim Black – rapper
 William Bolcom – composer
 Carrie Brownstein – musician, member of Sleater-Kinney
 Judy Collins – folk singer
 Kenny G – musician
 Isis Gee – American singer in Poland and Eurovision Song Contest entrant
 Stone Gossard – rhythm guitarist of Pearl Jam
 Natalie Grant – Christian music singer/songwriter
 Mary Lambert – singer
 Lil Mosey – rapper
 Macklemore – hip-hop artist, born Ben Haggerty
 Duff McKagan – bassist of Guns N' Roses
 Sir Mix-a-Lot – rap musician
 Mark O'Connor – country violinist (also performs in other genres)
 Stephen O'Malley – member of doom metal band Sunn O)))
 Jake One – hip-hop music producer
 Stacie Orrico – pop singer
 Jay Park – Korean-American singer
 Robin Pecknold – musician, lead singer in the folk-rock band Fleet Foxes
 Scott Rockenfield – drummer with Queensrÿche
 John Roderick – musician (The Long Winters), writer, and podcaster
 Jim Sheppard – bassist with Nevermore
 Kim Thayil – lead guitarist of the grunge band Soundgarden
 Janet Thurlow – jazz singer
 Rachel Trachtenburg – drummer, member of The Trachtenburg Family Slideshow Players
 Jennifer Warnes – singer and songwriter
 Mary Youngblood – Native American flutist
 Max Zorn – musician

Politics
 Jenny Durkan – Mayor of Seattle
 Maria Cantwell - U.S. Senator
 Steve Gunderson – politician in Montana.
 Jay Inslee – Governor of Washington
 Jerry Lewis – California politician
 Gary Locke – U.S. Ambassador to China, former U.S. Secretary of Commerce, former Governor of Washington
 Frank Murkowski – Polish-American politician, tenth Governor of Alaska
 Angela Rye – CNN political commentator
 Peter Steinbrueck – politician
 Lynn Woolsey – politician

Miscellaneous

 Marc D. Angel – rabbi
 Mario Batali – chef, writer, restaurateur and media personality
 Linda B. Buck – scientist
 Art Chantry – graphic design
 Greg Colson – artist
 Stephen Funk – former United States Marine Corps Lance Corporal who refused to deploy to Iraq 
 Emerald Ignacio (aka "DriftGirl") – actor and model; builds and races cars
 Irene Dubois – drag performer
 Amanda Knox – tried and convicted in Italy for murder of Meredith Kercher but subsequently acquitted on appeal
 Paul Kuniholm – artist
 Michael Leavitt (artist) – sculptor and toy maker
 Stephen S. Oswald – astronaut
 Casey Treat – pastor, televangelist 
 Jim Whittaker – first American to climb Mount Everest
 Lou Whittaker – mountaineer, founded Mount Rainier guide service
 Colleen Willoughby – philanthropist

Deceased

 Ann Reinking – actress, dancer, choreographer, All That Jazz, Micki + Maude, Annie
 Paul Jacob Alexander – newspaper publisher and Seattle City Councilman
 Paul Allen – co-founder of Microsoft
 Signe Toly Anderson – original lead singer of The Jefferson Airplane
 Richard Lee Armstrong – professor and geochemist
 Bob Bartlett – politician
 Lawrence James Beck – sculptor
 Frank T. Bell – United States Commissioner of Fish and Fisheries (1933–1939)
 Barbara Berjer – television actress
 Max Brand – author (pen name of Frederick Schiller Faust)
 Gerald Brashear – musician, played with Wyatt Ruther, Ray Charles, Della Reese, Cecil Young Quartet
 Chester Carlson – physicist and inventor
 Carol Channing – actress, Hello, Dolly!, Gentlemen Prefer Blondes, Thoroughly Modern Millie
 Irma Schoennauer Cole – swimmer, civil servant
 Chris Cornell – musician, Soundgarden, Audioslave, Temple of the Dog
 Don Coryell – NFL coach
 Marian Cummings (c. 1892–1984) – first woman in the US to gain a commercial pilot's license
 Warrel Dane – musician, singer for Sanctuary, Nevermore
 Jennifer Dunn – politician
 Frances Farmer – actress
 Pete Fleming – missionary to Ecuador
 Keith Godchaux – musician
 Kathi Goertzen – longtime news anchor for KOMO 4
 Richard F. Gordon Jr. – astronaut
 Bonnie Guitar – singer
 Ed Guthman – journalist
 Ivar Haglund – folksinger and restaurateur
 Jimi Hendrix – rock guitarist and singer
 Steven Hill – actor, portrayed Adam Schiff in the TV series Law & Order
 Eldon Hoke (aka El Duce) – drummer and singer of rock band The Mentors
 Art Hupy – photographer
 Fred Hutchinson – baseball player and manager
 Ruth Jessen – golfer
 Gary Kildall – scientist, inventor and founder of Digital Research
 Ed Lee – first Asian American mayor of San Francisco
 Gypsy Rose Lee – actress and burlesque star
 Mary Livingstone – comedian and wife of Jack Benny
 Kevin McCarthy – actor
 Mary McCarthy – author, critic and social activist
 Rob Roy McGregor (admiral) - U.S. Navy Rear Admiral and decorated submariner
 Alfred M. Moen – inventor and founder of Moen Incorporated
 Margaret Murie – environmentalist
 Harley D. Nygren – admiral and engineer, first Director of the National Oceanic and Atmospheric Administration Commissioned Officer Corps
 Adella M. Parker – suffragist, politician, lawyer, and high school teacher
 Walt Partymiller – cartoonist
 Tuulikki Pietilä – graphic artist and professor
 Guy Bates Post – stage and film actor
 Hal Riney – advertising executive
 Ron Santo – Hall of Fame baseball player
 Bell M. Shimada – fisheries scientist who pioneered the study of the tuna fishery in the tropical Pacific Ocean
 Robert Stroud – convicted felon, "Birdman of Alcatraz"
 Emmett Watson – journalist

Moved to Seattle

Living

 Zaid Abdul-Aziz – former Seattle SuperSonics power forward
 Dustin Ackley – former Seattle Mariners outfielder
 Sherman Alexie – author
 Kimball Allen – writer, playwright, performer, gay activist, author of Secrets of a Gay Mormon Felon and Be Happy Be Mormon
 Jeff Ament – bassist of Pearl Jam
 Brian Atwater – geologist
 Anomie Belle – musician
 BenDeLaCreme – actor, drag queen, 5th place and Miss Congeniality of Rupaul's Drag Race Season 6
 Jeff Bezos – former CEO and founder of Amazon.com
 Christopher Boffoli – photographer
 Jeff Borowiak – tennis player
 Bosco (drag queen)-contestant and finalist on Rupaul's Drag Race Season 14
 David Brewster – publisher and journalist
 Terry Brooks – author
 Robert Brown – musician, lead singer of Abney Park
 Ed Brubaker – comics writer and artist
 Peter Buck – musician in R.E.M.
 Charles Burns – cartoonist
 Matt Cameron – drummer of Soundgarden and Pearl Jam
 Dyan Cannon – actress
 Roberto Carcelen – Olympian
 Neko Case – musician
 J.R. Celski – Olympic speed skater
 Michael Chang – tennis player, French Open champion
 Valentina Chepiga – IFBB professional bodybuilder
 Dale Chihuly – glass blowing artist
 Nick Collison – Oklahoma City Thunder forward
 Emily Compagno – former federal attorney, Oakland Raiderettes cheerleader, sports reporter, and analyst; current litigator, legal analyst, and Fox News contributor
 Dan Corson – artist
 Kathryn Cramer – science fiction editor (lived in Seattle 1964–1985)
 Cameron Crowe – writer and director
 Chris DeWolfe – founder of MySpace
 Jim Donald – former CEO of Starbucks Coffee
 Mark Driscoll – co-founder and preaching pastor of Mars Hill Church
 Rob Estes – actor
 Anna Faris – actress
 Brendan Fraser – actor
 Ari Glass – painter, designer and musician
 Jorge Enrique González Pacheco – Cuban poet
 Neile Graham – poet
 Nicola Griffith – author
 Dave Grohl – drummer of Nirvana; lead singer, guitarist of Foo Fighters
 Caren Gussoff – author
 Gary Hall Jr. – 10-time Olympic medalist
 Leland H. Hartwell – Nobel Prize winner
 Matt Hasselbeck – quarterback, Seattle Seahawks player
 Jenni Hogan – KIRO-TV traffic anchor
 Jerry Holkins – co-creator of Penny Arcade
 David Horsey – cartoonist
 Tom Hulce – actor in National Lampoon's Animal House and Amadeus
 Jane Jensen – game designer and author
Phoenix Jones – superhero, vigilante
 Quincy Jones – musician
 S. T. Joshi – literary critic and editor
 Michael Kinsley – journalist
 Sascha Konietzko – founder and frontman of KMFDM
 Mike Krahulik – co-creator of Penny Arcade
 Jon Krakauer – author
 Jayne Ann Krentz – romance novelist
 Gary Larson – comic strip artist (The Far Side)
 Lusine – IDM musician
 Kyle MacLachlan – actor
 Dave Matthews – musician
 Taylor Mays – football player
 Jim McDermott – Congressman
 Rose McGowan – actress, Charmed, Jawbreaker
 Joel McHale – actor, host of  The Soup on E! and star of NBC television series Community
 Mike McCready – lead guitarist of Pearl Jam (considered local, went to grade school – college in Seattle)
 Carol Milne – Canadian American sculptor
 Patrick Monahan – lead singer of the band Train
 Jinkx Monsoon – actor, drag queen, winner of Rupaul's Drag Race Season 5
 Gabe Newell – CEO and founder of Valve
 Krist Novoselic – bassist of Nirvana
 Bill Nye – "Science Guy", actor, comedian
 Yuji Okumoto – actor, The Karate Kid, Part II and Real Genius; owner of Kona Kitchen
 Trey Parker – co-creator of South Park
 Susan Powter – motivational speaker, dietitian, personal trainer and author
 Karen Prell – puppeteer 
 Jeff Probst – host of TV show Survivor
 Julia Quinn - author 
 Jonathan Raban – author
 John Ratzenberger – actor, played Cliff Clavin on TV series Cheers
 Richard Read – journalist, Pulitzer Prize winner, 1999, 2001
 Ron Reagan – radio talk host, son of Ronald Reagan
 Gary Ridgway – serial killer
 Tom Robbins – author
 Don Roff – writer and filmmaker
 Ryan Rowland-Smith – Seattle Mariners pitcher
 Dan Savage – advice columnist
 Howard Schultz – chairman of Starbucks
 Ross Shafer – comedian and television host
 Richard Silverstein – blogger
 Tom Skerritt – actor
 Alex Steffen – award-winning author and editor
 Neal Stephenson – science-fiction author
 Adam Stern – symphony conductor
 Mack Strong – retired Seattle Seahawks fullback 1993–2007
 Ichiro Suzuki – baseball player, Seattle Mariners, New York Yankees, and Miami Marlins
 Robert Swift – former Seattle SuperSonics and Oklahoma City Thunder center
 Geoff Tate – lead singer of Queensrÿche
 Lauren Tewes – actress
 Earnest James Ujaama – community activist and indicted associate of al-Qaeda
 Eddie Vedder – lead singer of Pearl Jam
 Guy Williams – basketball player, Washington Bullets and Golden State Warriors
 Ann Wilson – lead singer and flute player of Heart
 Mark Wirth – "fashion notable", local character
 Al Young – dragster driver

Deceased

 Harry Anderson – actor
 Frank Barsotti – professional photographer
 Jack Bechdolt – journalist for Seattle Post Intelligencer, illustrator/artist, author of thousands of short stories
 Fred Beckey – mountaineer
 Bill Boeing – aviation pioneer, industrialist
 Robert Bray – actor
 Edwin Frederick Brotze – cartoonist for the Seattle Daily Times
 Francis H. Brownell – businessman, president of the Seattle First National Bank
 Ted Bundy – serial killer
 Octavia Butler – author
 Frank Calvert – cartoonist for the Seattle Daily Times
 James E. Casey – United Parcel Service founder
 Ray Charles – musician
 Charlie Chong – political activist
 Kurt Cobain – Nirvana frontman
 Frantz Hunt Coe – educator
 Alexander DeSoto – physician and philanthropist, founder of Seattle's first hospital
 James S. Ditty – photoengraver, Seattle Star
 James Doohan – actor; Montgomery Scott on Star Trek
 Ford Quint Elvidge – governor of Guam
 Frances Farmer – actress
 Kate Fleming – audio book narrator (voice-over actor) and producer
 George Frederick Frye – Seattle pioneer and politician
 Edgar Gott – aviation pioneer, first president of Boeing
 Carl F. Gould – architect, educator
 George Hager – cartoonist for the Seattle Post-Intelligencer
 John "DOK" Hager – cartoonist for the Seattle Daily Times
 Alex Haley – writer, author of Roots
 Anna Roosevelt Halsted – journalist, daughter of Franklin D. Roosevelt
 Victor Hanzeli – linguist, former Chair of the Department of Romance Languages and Literature at UW
 Mitch Hedberg – comedian
 Frank Herbert – novelist, author of Dune
 George H. Hitchings – scientist
 Alan Hovhaness – composer
 Edward Sturgis Ingraham – first superintendent of the Seattle Public Schools; mountaineer
 Ernest C. Jenner – illustrator for the Seattle Post-Intelligencer
 Russell Johnson – actor; Professor Roy Hinkley on Gilligan's Island 
 Jacob Lawrence – painter
 Brandon Lee – actor
 Bruce Lee – actor
 Denise Levertov – poet
 J. P. D. Lloyd – Episcopal cleric, the president of the Seattle Public Library
 Keye Luke – actor
 Betty MacDonald – author
 Helene Madison – three gold medals at 1932 Summer Olympics
 Benjamin Brown Martin – illustrator for the Seattle Daily Times
 Rick May – voice actor, theatrical performer, director, and teacher
 William Charles McNulty – illustrator for Seattle Star; teacher at Art Students League
 Asa Mercer – man behind the Mercer Girls, a model for the TV series Here Come the Brides
 Robert Moran – shipbuilder
 Marni Nixon – musician
 Henry O'Malley – United States Commissioner of Fish and Fisheries
 Alexander Pantages – theatrical entrepreneur
 Robert W. Patten – veteran, storyteller, inspiration for cartoon series
 Lionel Pries – architect, educator
 Henry Prusoff – tennis player
 Alfred T. Renfro – cartoonist, Seattle Star
 Theodore Roethke – poet
 Zola Helen Ross – author
 Ann Rule – true crime author
 Bill Russell – retired Hall of Fame basketball player and coach
 James Willis Sayre – theatre critic, journalist, arts promoter, and historian
 Jeff Smith – TV chef and author
 Layne Staley – musician, singer of grunge band Alice In Chains
 Henry Suzzallo – president of the University of Washington (1915–1926)
 Sarah Truax – stage actor
 August Wilson – playwright
 Andrew Wood – singer of grunge band Mother Love Bone
 Lillian Yarbo – actress, comedienne, dancer, and singer
 Mia Zapata – musician

Athletes from Seattle
 Aaron Brooks – NBA PG; Franklin High School
 Bobby Brown – MLB infielder and executive, played in four World Series
 Kevin Burleson – NBA PG; O'Dea High School
 Nate Burleson – NFL WR; O'Dea High School
 Jesse Chatman – NFL RB; Franklin High School
 Doug Christie – NBA SG; Rainier Beach High School
 Will Conroy – NBA PG; Garfield (Seattle)
 Fred Couples – PGA; O'Dea High School
 Jamal Crawford – NBA SG; Rainier Beach High School
 Michael Dickerson – NBA SF; Federal Way High School
 Corey Dillon – NFL RB; Franklin High School
 James Edwards – NBA PF; Roosevelt High School
 C. J. Giles – NBA PF; Rainier Beach High School
 Charlie Greene – USATF Olympian; Track & Field Hall of Fame; O'Dea High School
 Spencer Hawes – NBA C; Seattle Prep
 Phil Heath – second world ranked IFBB professional bodybuilder
 Jeff Jaeger – NFL K; University of Washington
 Ruth Jessen – professional golfer, Seattle University
 Earl Johnson – Major League Baseball P; Ballard High School
 Taylor Mays – NFL S; O'Dea High School
 Reese McGuire – MLB catcher; Kentwood High School
 Jack Medica – Olympic swimmer; University of Washington
 Hugh Millen – NFL QB; Roosevelt High School
 Nate Robinson – NBA PG; Rainier Beach High School
 Brandon Roy – NBA SF; Garfield (Seattle)
 Chester Simmons – NBA PG; Garfield (Seattle)
 Peyton Siva – NBA PG; Franklin High School (Seattle)
 Isaiah Stanback – NFL WR; Garfield (Seattle)
 Rodney Stuckey – NBA SG; Kentwood High School
 Jason Terry – NBA PG; Franklin High School
 Martell Webster – NBA SG; Seattle Prep
 Marcus Williams – NBA SF; Roosevelt High School
 Terrence Williams – NBA SF; Rainier Beach High School
 Sheila Lambert – WNBA PG; Chief Sealth High School
 Regina Rogers-Wright – College basketball All American C; Chief Sealth High School, UCLA and University of Washington.

Musical groups
 Abney Park – steampunk band, formerly goth
 Aiden – rock band (emo)
 Alice in Chains – rock band (grunge/metal)
 Amber Pacific – pop punk band
 Band of Horses – previously known as Horses, indie rock band
 The Blood Brothers – post-hardcore band
 Blue Scholars – hip hop
 Brite Futures – indie pop
 The Brothers Four – folksingers
 Candlebox – alternative band
 The Classic Crime – alternative band
 Common Market – hip hop
 Dave Matthews Band  – originated in Charlottesville, Virginia
 Death Cab for Cutie – alternative band
 Demon Hunter – metal band
 Earth – drone/doom band
 The Fall of Troy – post-hardcore band (originally from Mukilteo, Washington)
 Fleet Foxes – indie rock band
 Foo Fighters – rock band
 The Gits – rock band
 Grand Archives – alternative rock band
 Green River – rock band (grunge)
 Harvey Danger – alternative band
 He Is We – indie pop
 The Head and the Heart – indie rock band
 Heart – rock band
 Hey Marseilles – alternative band
 Himsa – Metalcore band
 I Declare War – deathcore band
 Ivan & Alyosha – pop rock band
 Jake One – hip hop producer
 Quincy Jones – jazz musician
 KMFDM – industrial band
 Macklemore and Ryan Lewis – hip hop/rap duo
 Melvins - sludge metal band (originally from Montesano, Washington)
 Metal Church – metal band
 Minus the Bear – alternative rock band
 Modest Mouse – indie rock band (from nearby Issaquah, Washington)
 Mother Love Bone – rock band (grunge)
 Mudhoney – rock band (grunge)
 Murder City Devils – rock band (garage rock)
 MxPx – rock band (punk rock)
 Nevermore – metal band
 Nirvana – rock band (grunge) (originally from Aberdeen, Washington)
 Odesza – electronic/experimental
 Pearl Jam – rock band (grunge)
 Pedro the Lion – indie rock band
 Pickwick – indie rock band
 The Postal Service – indietronica band
 Presidents of the United States of America – rock band
 Queensrÿche – metal band (from nearby Bellevue)
 Thee Satisfaction – hip hop/rap duo
 Schoolyard Heroes – horror punk/post hardcore (originally from Tacoma, Washington)
 The Scene Aesthetic – acoustic/indie pop band
 Shabazz Palaces – hip hop/rap duo
 Sinai 48 – a rock band that includes the former members of Buckingham Nicks
 Smoosh – alternative pop band
 Soundgarden – rock band (grunge)
 Sunn O))) – doom metal band
 Kyle Townsend – record producer, musician
 Trachtenburg Family Slideshow Players – indie rock/pop band
 Trial – political straightedge band
 Ugly Casanova – indie rock band featuring the main member Isaac Brock of Modest Mouse (from nearby Issaquah, Washington)
 Vendetta Red – rock band
 The Ventures – surf band

References

 
Seattle
Seattle
People